Gémigny is a commune in the Loiret department in north-central France.

See also
Communes of the Loiret department

References

Communes of Loiret